was a racehorse registered by the Japan Racing Association. Ten Point, Tosho Boy, and Green Grass were a group of Thoroughbred horses referred to as TTG.

Ten Point debuted in August 1975 as a racehorse. He gathered attention in a classic race in Kansai and was named "Young Youth of the Falling Star" due to his facial features and chestnut coat. He did not win the classic race, but he managed to win the Tenno Sho and the Arima Kinen at the age of four. His match race with Tosho Boy in the 1977 Arima Kinen race remains the most famous in horse racing history. In January 1978, Ten Point had a bone fracture in the middle of the Japanese Economy New Year Cup and died after 43 days of treatment.

Ten Point won the JRA Award for Best Two-Year-Old Colt in 1975 and the JRA Award for Best Older Male Horse in 1977. He was elected to the Japan Racing Association Hall of Fame in 1990. Akira Shikato was Ten Point's jockey.

Life

Before debut 
Ten Point was born on April 19, 1973, on Yoshida Farm, located in Hayakita, Hokkaido. Ten Point's father was a stallion named Contrite that was in a syndicate that was exported into Japan. Ten Point's mother was named Wakakumo and was a winner in the 1966 Oka Sho race. Regarding these two horses' breeding, Yoshida Farm's Shigeo Yoshido said, "I don't know how making this Contrite stallion my center focus will turn out, but I've created and put him in a syndicate, so this has to succeed. To do that, I have to have a good broodmare to produce a good child horse." According to Yoshido Farm's Haruo Yoshida, Ten Point was born with a form of "perfect quality." Ten Point was soon bought by Hisanari Takada for ¥15,000,000 and then it was decided that he would be managed by Sasuke Ogawa in a stable at the Rittō Training Center. Before the purchase, Ogawa said that Ten Point's entire body moved like a spring when he was at Yoshido Farm.

According to people involved at Yoshido Farm, Ten Point in his early childhood was clever enough not to go against humans and was always with his mother due to his dependent nature. When Ten Point's trainer chased him in order to make him exercise, he had extraordinarily fast running speed but was burdened with a delicate body and when he was the age of two, he injured the knee bone of his foreleg. Ten Point was supplied with milk for nutrition at an early age. Ten Point was fond of this milk and when he was fighting illness in 1978, he was given milk everyday per Yoshido Farm's recommendation.

Career

1975: Two-year-old season
Ten Point entered Ogawa Stable in March 1975. On August 17, Ten Point debuted in a match at the Hakodate Racecourse. Ten Point excelled three days prior at training and it was estimated that he had a 50% chance of winning. He became the most backed horse for the race. Ten Point started off well and then proceeded to keep his distance from the second place horse and maintain his first-place position for the remainder of the race. He beat the 1000m record at the Hakodate Racecourse by 0.5 seconds. After this race, he was reviewed to be a suitable Japanese Classic Race contestant.

After that race, Ogawa, his trainer, decided he would participate in two more races by the end of the year. His next race was set to be held in October, but due to excessive heat, it was moved to November. Ten Point won the race.

Ten Point participated in the Hanshin Juvenile Fillies. He was backed as the most popular choice for victory with a chance of over 50%. After passing the third corner, he dropped from third to sixth place without his bit and even his jockey gave up hope, but he started advancing forward at the fourth corner. He went straight ahead and halfway there, he reached first place and kept adding distance from other horses to maintain this position. He won and achieved another new record, beating the older horses that were participating in a different race the same day. He ended the 1975 season with three wins and zero losses. He was also won the JRA Award for Best Two-Year-Old Colt this year.

1976: Three-year-old season
By winning the Hanshin Three-year-old Stakes, Ten Point became recognized as a classic race contestant. He had Ten Point participate in the Kyōdō Tsūshin Cup to prepare for the Tokyo Yūshun at the Tokyo Racecourse. After that, they stayed at the Nakayama Racecourse and planned for the Satsuki Shō. Ten Point's management and training was left up to the jockey Akira Shikato and the groomer Yamada.

In the 1976 Tokyo Three-year-old Stakes, Ten Point went straight towards the slope and was victorious overall, but Climb Kaiser finished in a close second place. Ten Point also won the Satsuki Shō prep Spring Stakes, but the horse in second place was close once again.

Pedigree

References

1973 racehorse births
1978 deaths
Thoroughbred family 3
Racehorses bred in Japan
Racehorses trained in Japan
Horses who died from racing injuries